Night Arrival (Spanish:Llegada de noche) is a 1949 Spanish crime film directed by José Antonio Nieves Conde and starring  Adriana Benetti, Manolo Fábregas and Pedro Maratea.

Synopsis 
During the celebration of the Ibero-American Exposition in Seville, a girl and her mother arrive from Uruguay to visit the city. Once installed, her mother disappears unexpectedly.

Cast
   Adriana Benetti as Ina  
 Manolo Fábregas as Fernando 
 Pedro Maratea as Don Carlos Junquera  
 Antoñita Moreno as Amparo la Gaditana  
 Amparo Martí as Doña Milagros  
 Juan Espantaleón as Don León  
 Mariano Asquerino as Alcalde 
 Antonio Almorós as Novio de Amparo  
 Ramón Martori as Administrador del hotel  
 José Prada as Inspector de policía 
 Tony Hernández as Botones  
 Pilar Gómez as Camarera del hotel  
 Delia Luna as Lolita  
 Nieves Barbero  as Madre de Ina  
 Narciso Hernández de Córdoba  as Bailarín  
 José Franco as Encargado de noche  
 Juan Vázquez as Encargado de día  
 Agustina de Albaicín as Gitana  
 Emilio Santiago as Cochero Curro  
 Valeriano Andrés as Mozo de estación  
 Conchita Constanzo as Huésped

References

Bibliography 
 D'Lugo, Marvin. Guide to the Cinema of Spain. Greenwood Publishing, 1997.

External links 
 

1949 crime films
Spanish crime films
1949 films
1940s Spanish-language films
Films directed by José Antonio Nieves Conde
Films scored by Jesús García Leoz
Spanish black-and-white films
1940s Spanish films